Satellites & Sirens is a synth and guitar driven Christian rock band from Nashville, Tennessee.  Members include Geoff Hunker, lead singer and founder of the band, as well as Jonathan Dimmel (drums), David Troyer (guitar), and David Willey (bass/synth). The band formed in 2006 on Craigslist. While still in its infancy, it gained attention. MTV featured the band as its "Needle in the Haystack" spotlight artist for the week of Monday, June 21, 2010. Furthermore, the single Anchor climbed several charts including the Weekend 22, which airs on stations nationwide. Their self-titled album debuted March 2010 with Word Records.

History and Formation
In 2006, after Hunker moved to Nashville and began working with producer Rusty Varenkamp on what would become Satellites & Sirens, Hunker decided it was time to assemble a band. "I just put up an ad [on Craigslist] looking for guitar, bass, and drums to just see what happened," he says. "Probably 80 percent of the stuff that came out of it was just absolutely horrible." However, from the ad Hunker managed to find drummer Jonathan Dimmel, who impressed Hunker both musically and personally. Shortly after, Dimmel introduced both Willey and Troyer to Hunker and into S&S. The band was then promoted through online advertising and social networks. Despite their origins, the band members also consider themselves close friends as opposed to just co-workers. Josue S. Lopez, Ex-Representative, and Co-manager of the band overheard Dimmel remark, "A lot of bands don't have that. Especially when they don't go back further than, you know, two years off Craigslist."

Discography

Albums

EPs

Music videos

 "Breaking the Noise" from their 2010 self-titled album 'Satellites & Sirens' 
 "Take Me Back" from their 2010 self-titled album 'Satellites & Sirens'
 "Let It Go" from their 2011 album 'Frequency'

Awards

GMA Dove Awards

References

External links
 
 Official YouTube Channel

Christian rock groups from Tennessee
Electronic music groups from Tennessee
Musical groups from Nashville, Tennessee
Musical groups established in 2006
Musical quartets
2006 establishments in Tennessee